A heavy equipment operator operates heavy equipment used in engineering and construction projects. Typically only skilled workers may operate heavy equipment, and there is specialized training for learning to use heavy equipment.

Operator training
Various organizations set standards for training for heavy equipment operators. Such organizations typically offer what in the US is called "effective safety training". Specific organizations include the following:
 United States
 International Union of Operating Engineers
 Association of Equipment Manufacturers
 National Association of Heavy Equipment Training Schools
 Canada
 International Union of Operating Engineers

Safety 
Much publication about heavy equipment operators focuses on improving safety for such workers. The occupational medicine field researches and makes recommendations about safety for these and other workers in safety-sensitive positions.

Notable heavy equipment operators
 Mack Ray Edwards (1918–1971), child sex abuser/serial killer; buried victims at his construction sites; committed suicide by hanging in his prison cell

See also
 Benjamin Holt
 Construction worker
 Hydraulic machinery
 International Union of Operating Engineers

References

Construction trades workers
Operator